Bob Giesey (born c. 1946) is a former American football coach. He served as the head football coach at Ripon College in Ripon, Wisconsin from 1976 to 1979 and Grand Valley State University from 1983 to 1984, compiling a career college football coaching record of 30–27. Giesey lettered in football, basketball, and track and field at Dakota Wesleyan University.

Head coaching record

College

References

Year of birth missing (living people)
1940s births
Living people
American football quarterbacks
Ball State Cardinals football coaches
Dakota Wesleyan Tigers football players
Dakota Wesleyan Tigers men's basketball players
Grand Valley State Lakers football coaches
Northern Colorado Bears football coaches
Ripon Red Hawks football coaches
College men's track and field athletes in the United States
High school football coaches in Texas
People from Westmoreland County, Pennsylvania
Players of American football from Pennsylvania
Basketball players from Pennsylvania